The Florence American Cemetery and Memorial is about 7.5 miles (12 kilometers) south of Florence, Italy, about two miles (3 km) south of the Florence-Impruneta exit of the Rome-Milan autoroute.

Most of those buried here are from the Fifth Army who died in the fighting that followed the capture of Rome in June 1944; others fell in the heavy fighting in the Apennines between then and 2 May 1945.  It is run by the American Battle Monuments Commission.

Notable burials and memorials
 Medal of Honor recipients
 Addison Baker (1907–1943), United States Army Air Corps, for actions in World War II (cenotaph)
 Roy W. Harmon (1915–1944), United States Army, for actions against German forces in Italy
 George D. Keathley (1917–1944), United States Army, for actions against enemy forces in Italy
 War Correspondent
Ralph Barnes

See also
 Florence War Cemetery – a Commonwealth War Graves Commission cemetery near Florence
 Jewish monumental cemetery, Florence

External links
 American Battle Monuments Commission home page
 ABMC Florence cemetery web page
 ABMC Florence cemetery video .wmv
 ABMC Florence cemetery booklet .pdf
 

World War II cemeteries in Italy
World War II memorials in Italy
American Battle Monuments Commission
Cemeteries in Florence